Alexander James Bird (born 1964) is a British philosopher and Bertrand Russell Professor of Philosophy at the University of Cambridge.

Career
In 2020, Bird was elected to the Bertrand Russell Professorship of Philosophy, succeeding Huw Price.  Previously he was Peter Sowerby Professor of Philosophy and Medicine at King's College London (2018–2020) and the professor of philosophy at the University of Bristol (2003–2017). Bird was lecturer then reader and head of department at the University of Edinburgh (1993–2003).  Bird has also taught at Dartmouth College and at Saint Louis University and was a visiting fellow at All Souls College, Oxford.  He was chair of the Philosophy sub-panel in Research Excellence Framework 2014.

Books
 Philosophy of Science, Routledge, 1998
 Thomas Kuhn, Acumen/Princeton University Press, 2000
 Nature’s Metaphysics, Oxford University Press, 2007
 Knowing Science, Oxford University Press, 2022

See also
Department of Philosophy, King's College London

References

External links
Alexander Bird at KCL
Alexander Bird, Google Scholar
Alexander Bird's personal website

21st-century British philosophers
Living people
Academics of King's College London
1964 births
Metaphysicians
Academics of the University of Bristol
Academics of the University of Edinburgh
Alumni of the University of Cambridge
Alumni of the University of Oxford
Philosophers of medicine
Bertrand Russell Professors of Philosophy